Events in the year 1877 in India.

Incumbents

 Empress of India – Queen Victoria
 Viceroy of India – Robert Bulwer-Lytton, 1st Earl of Lytton

Events
 Celebrations in darbars are held in India now that Queen Victoria is Empress of India.
  1877 – Kutch Museum was founded.
 Gilgit Agency was formed.
 First suspension bridge in India was opened in Punalur, Travancore (now in Kerala).
 Jowaki Expedition against the Afridi tribe.

Law
Limitation Act
East India Loan Act (British statute)
Code Of Civil Procedure

Births
 2 November – Sir Sultan Mahomed Shah, Aga Khan III, The Founders and the First Permanent President of the All-India Muslim League (AIML). (Death, 11 July 1957).
 9 November – Sir, Dr. Allama Muhammad Iqbal, The Poet of The East, Presenter of the Idea of Pakistan (died, 21 April 1938 in Lahore, Pakistan).
 24 November – Kavasji Jamshedji Petigara, first Indian to become the Deputy Commissioner of Police of the Mumbai Police (d.1941).

Deaths
 30 August – Toru Dutt, poet (b.1856).

See also

References

 
India
Years of the 19th century in India